Dr. Joseph Oleskiw or Jósef Olesków ( Osyp Oleskiv, September 28, 1860 – October 18, 1903) was a Ukrainian professor of agronomy who promoted Ukrainian immigration to the Canadian prairies.  His efforts helped encourage the initial wave of settlers which began the Ukrainian Canadian community.

Ukraine
Joseph Oleskiw was born in the village of Nova Skvariava (Nowa Skwarzawa), near Zhovkva, in the Austro-Hungarian province of Galicia (now western Ukraine). His father, a Greek (Eastern) Catholic parish priest, was a member of the rural élite. Oleskiw studied geography and agriculture at the University of Lemberg (Lviv, Ukraine).  He was appointed professor of agronomy at the teacher's college in Lemberg.

Early immigration
Ukrainian immigrants who had travelled to Brazil and Argentina, enticed by the free transportation they had received, sent back word that conditions there were worse than in their homeland.  After hearing of the struggles of Ukrainian immigrants in Brazil, Oleskiw investigated alternative choices.  He determined that the Canadian prairies were the most suitable for the Ukrainian farmers. This led to Oleskiw writing two pamphlets in Ukrainian – "On Free Lands" (Pro Vilni Zemli, spring 1895), and "On Emigration" (O emigratsiy, December 1895) – and one in Polish. Oleskiw sought and obtained the endorsement of the Prosvita Society that a non-commercial, non-profit effort to help the immigrants should be implemented.

The journey
Oleskiw left for Canada along with Ivan Dorundiak, a representative of the farming community, on July 25, 1895 on a fact-finding journey that would span three months. Along the way, at length he met with Sir Charles Tupper, at that time Canada's High Commissioner in London. The correspondence between Oleskiw and the Canadian Government was conducted with the aid of the London embassy. Because of Oleskiw's efforts, on the one hand, and the Canadian government's direct involvement, on the other, the flow of Ukrainians to Canada was much more targeted and organized than that to the United States.

Canada
On August 12, 1895, they arrived in Montreal. On reaching Winnipeg, Oleskiw met with H.H. Smith, Commissioner of Dominion Lands under the Dominion Lands Act, who assigned Hugo Carstens, who spoke German, to act as an interpreter and guide for Oleskiw and Dorundiak's tour of Western Canada. Oleskiw was particularly interested in the area of Stony Plain, District of Alberta, due west of Edmonton, where a number of German settlements had been started. In the region of Beaverhill Creek, northeast of Edmonton, he encountered 16 Ukrainian families who had recently taken up homesteads. Following an inspection of Vancouver Island, he returned to Winnipeg and then traveled to Ottawa via the United States.

Immigration to Canada begins
Oleskiw believed in selective emigration.  His first group of settlers were thirty hand-picked families, led by his brother Vladymir (Volodymyr), who arrived in Canada in Quebec City on April 30, 1896. The majority of these immigrants settled in Edna, District of Alberta, northeast of Edmonton.

Later that summer, seventeen Oleskiw families led by Cyril Genik, and nine who had left on their own from Bukovina, also settled in Manitoba in the Stuartburn district. The first representatives of the intelligentsia – Cyril (Kyrylo) Genik, Ivan Bodrug, and Ivan Negrich – guided contingents of Dr. Oleskiw's settlers to Canada in 1896 and 1897. Genik preferred Stuartburn, a district not recommended by Oleskiw; as it was close to the large Mennonite settlement near Gretna, and commercial farms in North Dakota and Minnesota, where those Ukrainians who needed cash might earn some extra money. As the Riding Mountains resembled the Carpathian foothills, some families also found their way into this area.

Thus began the massive, continuous influx of Ukrainian immigration to Canada. Due in part to the widespread distribution of Oleskiw's literature, Ukrainians became the largest Slavic group in Canada, with a population of at least 170,000 by August 1914. Although Oleskiw promoted emigrants based on their assimilationist tendencies, the mass of Ukrainians that followed them tended to retain their cultural heritage.

Later life
Oleskiw was married twice and had two sons and two daughters from his first marriage. In 1900 Olesków was appointed principal of a teacher's college in Sokal. The departure from Lemberg, political pressure and the death of his first wife led him to withdraw from emigration promotion after his move. Three years after the appointment to Sokal, he died suddenly at the age of 43.

Legacy

Oleskiw's accomplishments in organizing Ukrainian immigration to Canada were threefold. First, he diverted to Canada thousands of Ukrainians destined for Brazil. Second, in attempting to regulate the number of peasants leaving Western Ukraine in any given year, he tried to prevent Galician land prices from falling drastically; though in this he was only partially successful. Third, in organizing the immigrants’ journey, he sought not only to prevent exploitation by unscrupulous officials and ticket agents but to secure the Canadian government's co-operation in the early stages of immigration.

Today Oleskiw Park and the Oleskiw neighbourhood in Edmonton, Alberta are named after him.

See also
 Iwan Pylypow
 Cyril Genik
 Block settlement
 Ukrainian Canadians
 Clifford Sifton
 Ukrainian Cultural Heritage Village
 List of Canadian place names of Ukrainian origin

References

Bibliography
 Martynowych, Orest T.  Ukrainians in Canada: The Formative Period, 1891-1924. Canadian Institute of Ukrainian Studies Press, University of Alberta, Edmonton, 1991.
 Marunchak, Michael, H. The Ukrainian Canadians: A History, Winnipeg, Ottawa: Ukrainian Free Academy of Sciences, 1970.
 Gerus, Oleh W. "Nestor Dmytriw", Dictionary of Canadian Biography.
 Subtelny, Orest. Ukrainians In North America, An Illustrated History, University of Toronto Press, Toronto, 1991.

External links
Kurelek, An NFB Film, 1967

 
 Biography at the Dictionary of Canadian Biography Online
 CKUA heritage trails article
 Section from Michael Ewanchuk's book: Reflections and reminiscences: Ukrainians in Canada, 1892-1992

1860 births
1903 deaths
Austro-Hungarian writers
Ukrainian writers
Ukrainian Austro-Hungarians
Agriculturalists
Ukrainian agronomists
Ukrainian academics
Ukrainian diaspora in Canada
Persons of National Historic Significance (Canada)
People from Lviv Oblast
People from the Kingdom of Galicia and Lodomeria